Almighty: Kill Your Gods is a multiplayer role-playing game developed by RUNWILD Entertainment and published by Versus Wild. It utilities game genres like action-adventure, crafting, character customization, hack and slash and fantasy elements.

Gameplay 
The game allows the player to pick either female or male gender for their character and over the time of playing. The player is tasked with managing their island, sourcing materials and food for the island and protecting the island from evil demigods and creatures. The game can be played either online with other players or alone. The premise of the game is to level up your character by completing quests and improving skills. The game has a similar theme to the Elder Scrolls Online with the fantasy and magic powers the player can gain.

Release
Versus Evil released the game in early access and the game is currently in early access with updates continuing to improve the gameplay and other problems.

References

External links

Action-adventure games
Cooperative video games
Fantasy video games
Video games developed in the United States
Windows games
Windows-only games
2021 video games